Spiranthes brevilabris, the short lipped ladies' tresses or Texas lady's tresses is a rare and endangered orchid native to the southeastern United States.

Variations

There are two recognized variations:
 Spiranthes brevilabris var. brevilabris
 Spiranthes brevilabris var. floridana

Description

Spiranthes brevilabris plants are 7–40 cm tall, with 3-5 basal leaves usually present when flowering. Flowers are arranged in a spiral around the stem, with a cream white to ivory yellow color. The inside of the lip is yellow. Bloom time is February to April.

Distribution and habitat

Spiranthes brevilabris can be found in Florida and Texas, with historic records from Mississippi, Louisiana, Georgia and Alabama but assumed to be extirpated in those states. It grows in wet pine savannas and moist meadows and roadsides.

Taxonomy
Spiranthes brevilabris was first described by John Lindley in 1840.

References

brevilabris
Orchids of the United States